Mukhtiar Ali Unar (born 1 September 1964) is a Pakistani academician, researcher, educationist, and writer. He is editor of Mehran University Research Journal of Engineering and Technology since 2008. He was a host and writer at Radio Pakistan Hyderabad in the 1980s and 1990s.

Biography 
Mukhtiar Ali Unar was born on 1 September 1964 at Village Din Muhammad Unar, Taluka and District Matiari, Sindh, Pakistan. He graduated in Electronic Engineering from Mehran University of Engineering and Technology, Jamshoro. He received Master and PhD degrees in Engineering from University of Glasgow, Glasgow, Scotland, UK.

He started his career as a lecturer in the Department of Electronic Engineering in Mehran University of Engineering and Technology, Jamshoro in 1986. Currently, he is Meritorious Professor and Dean of the Faculty of Electrical, Electronic and Computer Engineering in the same university. He is also Chief Editor of Mehran University Research Journal of Engineering and Technology.  He is Program Evaluator of National Computing Education Accreditation Council Islamabad and Pakistan Engineering Council.

He has produced more than 60 research articles related to Artificial Intelligence, Data Science and Control Engineering. He was member of National Plagiarism Standing Committee of HEC from 2014 to 2018 and Director of the Institute of Information and Communication Technologies of Mehran University. He is Chairman of the anti Harassment Committee of Mehran University since 2015,. He served as Pro Vice Chancellor of Shaheed Zulfiqar Ali Bhutto Campus, Khairpur Mirs.

Literary Contributions 
He was a  host and writer at Radio Pakistan Hyderabad in the 1980s and 1990s. He has written more than 100 literary articles on the history and culture of Sindh. He hosted a Sindhi Science program on Radio Pakistan Hyderabad for more than 5 years.

References 

Pakistani educators
Pakistani science writers
Mehran University of Engineering & Technology alumni
Academic staff of Mehran University of Engineering & Technology
Pakistani electronics engineers
Pakistani engineers
 People from Matiari District
Sindhi people
1964 births
Living people
Alumni of the University of Glasgow